The April 2015 Nepal earthquake (also known as the Gorkha earthquake) killed 8,964 people and injured 21,952 more. It was the worst natural disaster to strike Nepal since the 1934 Nepal–Bihar earthquake. The ground motion recorded in Kathmandu, capital of Nepal, was of low frequency, which, along with its occurrence at an hour where many people in rural areas were working outdoors, decreased the loss of property and human lives.

The earthquake triggered an avalanche on Mount Everest, killing 22, the deadliest incident on the mountain on record. The earthquake triggered another huge avalanche in the Langtang valley, where 250 people were reported missing.

Hundreds of thousands of Nepalese were made homeless with entire villages flattened, across many districts of the country. Centuries-old buildings were destroyed at UNESCO World Heritage Sites in the Kathmandu Valley, including some at the Kathmandu Durbar Square, the Patan Durbar Square, the Bhaktapur Durbar Square, the Changu Narayan Temple, the Boudhanath stupa and the Swayambhunath stupa. Geophysicists and other experts had warned for decades that Nepal was vulnerable to a deadly earthquake, particularly because of its geology, urbanization, and architecture. It was a part of the architecture of Kathmandu recognized by UNESCO.

Continued aftershocks occurred throughout Nepal at the intervals of 15–20 minutes, with one shock reaching a magnitude of 6.7 on 26 April at 12:54:08 NST. The country also had a continued risk of landslides.

The epicenter was near the Chinese border between the capital of Kathmandu and Mount Everest. More than 200 people were killed and over 2,500 were injured by this aftershock, and many were left homeless.

Earthquake

The earthquake was initially reported as 7.5 Mw by the United States Geological Survey (USGS) before it was quickly upgraded to 7.8 Mw. The China Earthquake Networks Center (CENC) reported the earthquake's magnitude to be 8.1 Ms. The India Meteorological Department (IMD) said two powerful quakes were registered in Nepal at 06:11 UTC and 06:45 UTC. The first quake measured 7.8 Mw and its epicenter was identified at a distance of 80 km to the northwest of Kathmandu, the capital of Nepal. Bharatpur was the nearest major city to the main earthquake,  as the crow flies from the epicenter. The second earthquake was somewhat less powerful at 6.6 Mw. Over thirty-eight aftershocks of magnitude 4.5 Mw or greater occurred in the day following the initial earthquake, including the one of magnitude 6.8 Mw.

According to the USGS, the earthquake was caused by a sudden thrust, or release of built-up stress, along the major fault line where the Indian Plate, carrying India, is slowly diving underneath the Eurasian Plate, carrying much of Europe and Asia. Kathmandu, situated on a block of crust approximately 120 km (74 miles) wide and 60 km (37 miles) long, rapidly shifted 3 m (10 ft) to the south in a matter of just 30 seconds.

The risk of a large earthquake was well known beforehand. In 2013, in an interview with seismologist Vinod Kumar Gaur, The Hindu quoted him as saying, "Calculations show that there is sufficient accumulated energy [in the Main Frontal Thrust], now to produce an 8 magnitude earthquake. I cannot say when. It may not happen tomorrow, but it could possibly happen sometime this century, or wait longer to produce a much larger one." According to Brian Tucker, founder of a nonprofit organization devoted to reducing casualties from natural disasters, some government officials had expressed confidence that such an earthquake would not occur again. Tucker recounted a conversation he had had with a government official in the 1990s who said, "We don't have to worry about earthquakes anymore, because we already had an earthquake"; the previous earthquake to which he referred occurred in 1934. In fact, the 600-km-long Central Himalayan Gap hadn't ruptured since 1505.

Geology

Geologically, the Nepal Himalayas are sub-divided into five tectonic zones from north to south and, east to west and almost parallel to sub-parallel. These five distinct morpho-geotectonic zones are: (1) Terai Plain, (2) Sub Himalaya (Shivalik Range), (3) Lesser Himalaya (Mahabharat Range and mid valleys), (4) Higher Himalaya, and (5) Inner Himalaya (Tibetan Tethys). Each of these zones is clearly identified by its morphological, geological, and tectonic features.

The location, magnitude, and focal mechanism of the earthquake suggest that it was caused by a slip along the Main Frontal Thrust.

Based on a study published in 2014, of the Main Frontal Thrust, on average a great earthquake occurs every 750 ± 140 and 870 ± 350 years in the east Nepal region. A study from 2015 found a 700-year delay between earthquakes in the region. The study also suggests that because of tectonic stress buildup, the earthquake from 1934 in Nepal and the 2015 quake are connected, following a historic earthquake pattern. A 2016 study on historical great (M ≥ 8) earthquake pairs and cycles found that associated great earthquakes are likely to occur in the West China region through the 2020s.

Intensity

According to the USGS website, the maximum intensity was VIII (Severe), however certain reports state an intensity of X (Extreme) or higher. In most of Kathmandu the intensity was VIII-IX, as evidenced by the numerous undamaged water towers installed on top of undamaged multi story buildings. Tremors were felt in the neighboring Indian states of Bihar, Uttar Pradesh, Assam, West Bengal, Odisha, Sikkim, Jharkhand, Uttarakhand, Gujarat, in the National Capital Region around New Delhi and as far south as Karnataka. Damage was extensive in northern Bihar and minor damage was also reported from parts of Odisha. Shaking was felt in high-rise buildings as far as Kochi in the southern state of Kerala. The intensity in Patna was V (Moderate). The intensity was IV (Light) in Dhaka, Bangladesh. Tremors were felt in Pakistan and Bhutan.

Aftershocks

A series of aftershocks began immediately after the mainshock, at intervals of 15–30 minutes, with one aftershock reaching 6.6Mw within 34 minutes of the initial quake. The aftershock caused fresh avalanches on Mount Everest and was felt in many places in northern India including Kolkata, Siliguri, Jalpaiguri, and Assam. The aftershock caused a landslide on the Koshi Highway, which blocked the section of the road between Bhedetar and Mulghat.

As of 24 May 2016, 459 aftershocks had occurred with different epicenters and magnitudes equal to or above 4 Mw (out of which 51 aftershocks are equal to or above 5 Mw and 5 aftershocks above 6 Mw) and more than 20,000 aftershocks less than 4 Mw.

12 May 2015 earthquake

A second major earthquake occurred on 12 May 2015 at 12:50 NST with a moment magnitude (Mw) of 7.3Mw 18 km (11 mi) southeast of Kodari. The epicenter was near the Chinese border between the capital city of Kathmandu and Mount Everest. It struck at the depth of 18.5 km (11.5 miles). This earthquake occurred along the same fault as the original magnitude 7.8 earthquake of 25 April but further to the east. As such, it is considered to be an aftershock of 25 April quake. Tremors were also felt in northern parts of India including Bihar, Uttar Pradesh, West Bengal and other North-Indian States. At least 153 died in Nepal as a result of the aftershock and about 2,500 were injured. 62 others died in India, two in Bangladesh, and one in China.

Aftermath

Disastrous events in very poor and politically paralyzed nations such as Nepal often become a long drawn out chain of events, in that one disaster feeds into another for years or even decades upon end. The aftereffects from the earthquake had subsequent effects on a myriad of things: human trafficking, labour cost and availability, rental and property cost burdens, urbanization, private and public debt burdens, mental health, politics, tourism, disease, and damage to the healthcare system. A survey some 30 months afterwards found only 12% of the reconstruction money had been distributed, and those without land were locked out of financial support, exacerbating the social divide and feeding marginalization.

More direct effects
Some disasters that came with the monsoon season were suspected to be related to the earthquake. There was a landslip on 11 June, killing 53 people. Meanwhile, a glacial lake had burst in particularly hard hit Solukhumbhu district. Whether or not the quake had contributed to such events is often unknown and unresearched, but certainly possible.

Casualties

Nepal
The earthquake killed at least 8,857 people in Nepal and injured nearly three times as many. The rural death toll may have been minimized by the fact that most villagers were outdoors working when the quake hit. As of 15 May, 6,271 people, including 1,700 from the 12 May aftershock, were still receiving treatment for their injuries. Nearly 3.5 million people were left homeless.

The example of this earthquake shows that loss calculations for hypothetical likely future earthquakes can be reasonably reliable. In 2005, the expected numbers of fatalities due to a hypothetical scenario earthquake near Kathmandu for M8.1 was published. The fatalities at that time were estimated between 21,000 and 42,000. The M7.8 earthquake of 25 April 2015 killed about 8,800 people because it occurred on a Saturday and so many buildings that collapsed, such as schools and municipal buildings, were empty, reducing the death toll. In addition, the epicentre of the earthquake was in a rural setting, so the worst hit districts had low population densities and most of the population was outside when the earthquake hit. Had the earthquake occurred at night or during the working week, when many more people were inside vulnerable buildings, the death toll would have likely been much closer to the modelled estimate. 

After the rupture area of the Kathmandu 2015 earthquake had been derived and the intensities of shaking had been mapped, a line source model for losses could be constructed with energy being radiated along the entire rupture. The fatalities estimated in this way by QLARM agree with those reported in the end. The figure shows reports of fatalities as a function of time. News reports significantly underestimated the actual numbers of fatalities for several days.

The Himalayan Times reported that as many as 20,000 foreign nationals may have been visiting Nepal at the time of the earthquake, although reports of foreign deaths were relatively low.

India

A total of 78 deaths were reported in India – including 58 in Bihar, 16 in Uttar Pradesh, 3 in West Bengal and 1 in Rajasthan.

China
Twenty-seven people were confirmed dead, 383 were injured and 4 were missing, all from the Tibet Autonomous Region. 
The quake destroyed 2,500 houses and damaged 24,700 others across 19 counties in Tibet, affecting nearly 300,000 people, among whom 47,500 were displaced, while A total of 82 temples were also damaged.  The counties of Gyirong, Nyalam and Tingri in Xigazê were worst hit, where nearly 80 percent of the houses in the three counties collapsed.

Bangladesh
Four people were killed and 18 districts were affected by the earthquake in Bangladesh. A six-story building partially collapsed and two garment factories tilted in Dhaka. A 22-year old man died when trying to flee the Dhaka Medical College in a panic. In Mirzapur, a woman died trying to escape a building. Another woman was crushed to death by a collapsed wall while a teacher died of a heart attack during the earthquake.

Avalanches on Mount Everest

This earthquake caused avalanches on Mount Everest. At least 19 died, with at least 120 others injured or missing.

Landslides in the Langtang Valley
In the Langtang valley located in Langtang National Park, 329 people were reported missing after an avalanche hit the village of Ghodatabela and the village of Langtang. The avalanche was estimated to have been two to three kilometres wide. Ghodatabela was an area popular on the Langtang trekking route. The village of Langtang was destroyed by the avalanche. Smaller settlements on the outskirts of Langtang were buried during the earthquake, such as Chyamki, Thangsyap, and Mundu. Twelve locals and two foreigners were believed to have survived. Smaller landslides occurred in the Trishuli River Valley with reports of significant damage at Mailung, Simle, and Archale. On 4 May it was announced that 52 bodies had been found in the Langtang area, of which seven were of foreigners.

According to geological models, the frequency and intensity of future landslides in the Langtang Valley is due to increase in the coming decades. This is attributable directly to the effect of the earthquake, which caused widespread fracturing in the grounds of the Langtang area.

Damage

Thousands of houses were destroyed across many districts of the country, with entire villages flattened, especially those near the epicenter.

The Tribhuvan International Airport serving Kathmandu was closed immediately after the earthquake, but was re-opened later in the day for relief operations and, later, for some commercial flights. It subsequently shut down operations sporadically due to aftershocks, and on 3 May was closed temporarily to the largest planes for fear of runway damage. During strong aftershocks, the airport opened all boarding-lounge exit doors onto the tarmac, allowing people who were waiting post security and immigration to flee to the open spaces of the runway tarmac. Many remained outside as planes were delayed and the airport swelled to capacity. The airport facilities suffered damage and there was no running water or operating toilets in the airport lounges. Few airport workers were at their posts; most were killed in the earthquake or had to deal with its aftereffects.

Flights resumed from Pokhara, to the west of the epicentre, on 27 April.

Several of the churches in the Kathmandu valley were destroyed. As Saturday is the principal day of Christian worship in Nepal, 500 people were reported to have died in the collapses.

Several temples on Kathmandu Durbar Square, a UNESCO World Heritage Site, collapsed, as did the Dharahara tower, built in 1832; the collapse of the latter structure killed at least 180 people, Manakamana Temple in Gorkha, previously damaged in an earlier quake, tilted several inches further. The northern side of Janaki Mandir in Janakpur was reported to have been damaged. Several temples, including Kasthamandap, Panchtale temple, the top levels of the nine-story Basantapur Durbar, the Dasa Avtar temple and two shrines located behind the Shiva Parvati temple were demolished by the quake. Some other monuments including the Taleju Bhawani Temple partially collapsed.

The top of the Jaya Bageshwari Temple in Gaushala and some parts of the Pashupatinath Temple, Swyambhunath, Boudhanath Stupa, Ratna Mandir, inside Rani Pokhari, and Durbar High School have been destroyed.

In Patan, the Char Narayan Mandir, the statue of Yog Narendra Malla, a pati inside Patan Durbar Square, the Taleju Temple, the Hari Shankar, Uma Maheshwar Temple and the Machhindranath Temple in Bungamati were destroyed. In Tripureshwar, the Kal Mochan Ghat, a temple inspired by Mughal architecture, was completely destroyed and the nearby Tripura Sundari also suffered significant damage. In Bhaktapur, several monuments, including the Phasi Deva temple, the Chardham temple and the 17th century Vatsala Durga Temple were fully or partially destroyed.

Outside the Valley, the Manakamana Temple in Gorkha, the Gorkha Durbar, the Palanchok Bhagwati, in Kabhrepalanchok District, the Rani Mahal in Palpa District, the Churiyamai in Makwanpur District, the Dolakha Bhimsensthan in Dolakha District, and the Nuwakot Durbar suffered varying degrees of damage. Historian Prushottam Lochan Shrestha stated, "We have lost most of the monuments that had been designated as World Heritage Sites in Kathmandu, Bhaktapur and Lalitpur District, Nepal. They cannot be restored to their original states." The northeastern parts of India also received major damage. Heavy shocks were felt in the states of Uttrakhand, Uttar Pradesh, West Bengal and others. Huge damage was caused to the property and the lives of the people.

Economic loss

Concern was expressed that harvests could be reduced or lost this season as people affected by the earthquake would have only a short time to plant crops before the onset of the Monsoon rains.

Nepal, with a total Gross Domestic Product of US$19.921 billion (according to a 2012 estimate), is one of Asia's poorest countries, and has little ability to fund a major reconstruction effort on its own. Even before the quake, the Asian Development Bank estimated that it would need to spend about four times more than it currently does annually on infrastructure through to 2020 to attract investment. The U.S. Geological Survey initially estimated economic losses from the tremor at 9 per cent to 50 per cent of gross domestic product, with a best guess of 35 per cent. "It's too hard for now to tell the extent of the damage and the effect on Nepal's GDP", according to Hun Kim, an Asian Development Bank (ADB) official. The ADB said on the 28th that it would provide a US$3 million grant to Nepal for immediate relief efforts, and up to US$200 million for the first phase of rehabilitation.

Rajiv Biswas, an economist at a Colorado-based consultancy, said that rebuilding the economy will need international effort over the next few years as it could "easily exceed" USD$5 billion.

Social effects

It was reported that the survivors were preyed upon by human traffickers involved in the supply of girls and women to the brothels of South Asia. These traffickers took advantage of the chaos that resulted from the aftermath of the earthquake. The most affected were women from poor communities who lost their homes.
In response to the unsafe conditions of the temporary campsites, international organizations implemented Safety Committees which were provided cash grants for necessities like additional toilets and bathrooms.

Most affected
Single women had very little access to relief, according to a report by the Inter-party Women's Alliance (IPWA). The report also found that violence and rapes against women and minors has increased after the earthquake. Additionally, the earthquake has significantly affected certain groups of people. Tibeto-Burman peoples were hardest hit as they tend to inhabit the higher slopes of mountains as opposed to the central valleys and are less educated and connected. All of these factors make them harder to access. According to a government survey, malnutrition in children has worsened considerably some 3 months after the quake, with the most undernourished being Tamang and Chepang peoples. Before the quake, 41 percent of children under five were stunted, 29 percent were underweight and 11 percent were emaciated, according to the World Food Programme.

Disease
Though a feared mass cholera outbreak failed to materialize (there were sporadic reports), other outbreaks were reported. At least 13 people died of scrub typhus while 240 people were taken ill since the disease was first diagnosed in the country in August 2015 until September 2016. The mental and emotional impact of an earthquake is the other invisible disaster.

Rescue and relief

About 90% of soldiers from the Nepalese Army were sent to the stricken areas in the aftermath of the earthquake under Operation Sankat Mochan, with volunteers mobilized from other parts of the country. Rainfall and aftershocks were factors complicating the rescue efforts, with potential secondary effects like additional landslides and further building collapses being concerns. Impassable roads and damaged communications infrastructure posed substantial challenges to rescue efforts. Survivors were found up to a week after the earthquake.

As of 1 May international aid agencies like Médecins Sans Frontières and the Red Cross were able to start medically evacuating the critically wounded by helicopter from outlying areas, initially cut-off from the capital city, Kathmandu, and treating others in mobile and makeshift facilities. There was concern about epidemics due to the shortage of clean water, the makeshift nature of living conditions and the lack of toilets.

Emergency workers were able to identify four men who had been trapped in rubble, and rescue them, using advanced heartbeat detection. The four men were trapped in up to ten feet of rubble in the village of Chautara, north of Kathmandu. An international team of rescuers from several countries using FINDER devices found two sets of men under two different collapsed buildings.

Volunteers used crisis mapping to help plan emergency aid work. Local organization Kathmandu Living Labs helped coordinate local knowledge on the ground and collaborated with international crisis mapping and humanitarian organizations. Public volunteers from around the world participated in crowdmapping and added details into online maps. Information was mapped from data input from social media, satellite pictures and drones of passable roads, collapsed houses, stranded, shelterless and starving people, who needed help, and from messages and contact details of people willing to help. On-site volunteers verified these mapping details wherever they could to reduce errors. The technologies used by Kathmandu Living Labs were built on top of existing open source solutions which allowed them to work in a fast and cost effective manner.

Digital mappers, through the Kathmandu Living Labs, were already charting the densely populated Kathmandu Valley, and then focused on earthquake relief. "They were doing an inventory in the poorer communities where they didn't have a very good sense of the quality of buildings," says Cowan, whose students helped add Kathmandu's buildings and roads to OpenStreetMap. First responders, from Nepalese citizens to the Red Cross, the Nepal army and the United Nations used this data. The Nepal earthquake crisis mapping utilized experience gained and lessons learned about planning emergency aid work from earthquakes in Haiti and Indonesia.

India pledged to donate $1 billion in cash and materials to Nepal. India's External Affairs Minister Sushma Swaraj said "I am happy to announce Government of India's pledge for Nepal's post-earthquake reconstruction of Nepali Rupees 10,000 crores, equivalent to one billion US dollars, one fourth of it as Grant." The International Conference on Nepal's Reconstruction has been organised by the Nepalese government to raise funds for rebuilding the country.

Reports are also coming in of sub-standard relief materials and inedible food being sent to Nepal by many of the foreign aid agencies.

A United States Marine Corps helicopter crashed on 12 May while involved in delivering relief supplies. The Bell UH-1Y Venom crashed at Charikot, roughly 45 miles (72 kilometres) east of Kathmandu. Two Nepalese soldiers and six American Marines died in the crash.

Need-fulfillment application, Getmii, launched a special pilot version in partnership with the Red Cross to double daily blood donors at the Kathmandu donation center using the app.

Imaging technologies such as satellites and smartphones, were instrumental to relief efforts in Nepal. GLIMS, group of volunteer scientists from nine nations, were able to provide rapid, systematic mapping of the damaged area, allowing the investigation of earthquake-induced geo-hazard processes that provided information to relief and recovery officials on the same timeframe as those operations were occurring.

Charities and Crowdfunding platforms received over $230 million in donations from support groups. The money was used to provide medical supplies, for reconstruction of damaged buildings including schools and hospitals, and building orphanages for the victims among other things.

Repair and reconstruction

Monuments

UNESCO and the Ministry of Culture began strengthening damaged monuments in danger of collapsing before the monsoon season. Subsequent restoration of collapsed structures, including historic houses is planned. Architectural drawings exist that provide plans for reconstruction. According to UNESCO, more than 30 monuments in the Kathmandu Valley collapsed in the quakes, and another 120 incurred partial damage. Repair estimates are $160 million to restore 1,000 damaged and destroyed monasteries, temples, historic houses, and shrines across the country. The destruction is concentrated in the Kathmandu Valley. UNESCO designated seven groups of multi-ethnic monuments clustered in the valley as a single World Heritage Site, including Swayambhu, the three squares namely Durbar square of Kathmandu, Patan Durbar Square, and Bhaktapur Durbar Square, and the Hindu temples of Pashupatinath and Changu Narayan. Damaged in the quakes were the structures in the three Durbar squares, the temple of Changu Narayan, and the 1655 temple in Sankhu. Drones fly above cultural heritage sites to provide 3D images of the damage to use for planning repairs.

Nepal Rural Housing Reconstruction Program

After an international donors conference held in Kathmandu on 25 June 2015 a multi donor trust fund of US$4.4 billion was established to aid the reconstruction of affected housing in 14 districts of Nepal. This covered 66 per cent of the country's total recovery and reconstruction needs of US$6.7 billion. Implementation of the Program consisted of five phases i.e. Survey, Identification and Validation, Enrollment, Reconstruction and Completion. The data was openly released to the public by the National Planning Commission and is available for download on their website.

International aid

A total of $3bn was pledged by donors to help rebuild Nepal. UNICEF said close to 1.7 million children had been driven out into the open, and were in desperate need of drinking water, psychological counsel, temporary shelters, sanitation and protection from disease outbreak. It distributed water, tents, hygiene kits, water purification tablets and buckets. Numerous other organizations provided similar support.

India was the first to respond within hours, being Nepal's immediate neighbour, with Operation Maitri which provided rescue and relief by its armed forces. It also evacuated its own and other countries' stranded nationals. India has been the largest aid donor to Nepal following the earthquake with a billion dollar support apart from other non-monetary reliefs extended. China, the Asian Development Bank and the United Kingdom provided significant bilateral aid and other nations and organisations provided aid, rescue teams and helicopters as requested by the Nepalese government.

On 26 April 2015, international aid agencies and governments mobilized rescue workers and aid for the earthquake. They faced challenges in both getting assistance to Nepal and ferrying people to remote areas as the country had few helicopters. Relief efforts were also hampered by Nepalese government insistence on routing aid through the Prime Minister's Disaster Relief Fund and its National Emergency Operation Center. After concerns were raised, it was clarified that "Non-profits" or NGOs already in the country could continue receiving aid directly and bypass the official fund. Aid mismatch and supply of "leftovers" by donors, aid diversion in Nepal, mistrust over control of the distribution of funds and supplies, congestion and customs delays at Kathmandu's airport and border check posts were also reported. On 3 May 2015, restrictions were placed on heavy aircraft flying in aid supplies after new cracks were noticed on the runway at the Tribhuvan International Airport, Nepal's only airport able to handle larger jet aircraft.

The list below gives a break-up of pledged donations, by each nation, along with aid in kind, delivered immediately.

See also

 Economy of Nepal
 Foreign aid to Nepal
 Geology of the Himalaya
 List of avalanches
 List of earthquakes in 2015
 List of earthquakes in China
 List of earthquakes in India
 List of earthquakes in Nepal
 List of earthquakes in South Asia
 List of people who died climbing Mount Everest
 List of World Heritage Sites in Nepal
 Operation Sahayogi Haat
 Politics of Nepal

References

External links

 Deadly earthquake Nepal on Earthquake Report Website
 USGS Earthquake Hazards Program on USGS Website
 National Seismological Center Nepali National Seismological Centre
 Tectonics & Earthquakes of Himalaya and the 2015 Earthquake in Nepal – IRIS Consortium
 The 25 April 2015, Gorkha, Nepal, Earthquake: An Expected Event that Defied Expectations – United States Geological Survey
 
 
 Nepal Earthquake: A Complete Timeline
Nepal Earthquake Open Data Portal by National Planning Commission has structural and socioeconomic data of over 1 million household and 762 thousand buildings of districts most severely effected by the earthquake.
 A number of digital resources relating to the earthquake and the aftermath are hosted by SOAS Digital Collections.

 
Nepal,04
Earthquake,04
Nepal earthquake
Nepal earthquake
Nepal earthquake
Nepal earthquake
Nepal earthquake
Nepal earthquake
Earthquakes in Bangladesh
2015, 04
Earthquakes in India
Earthquakes in Tibet
Natural disasters in Bihar
Nepal earthquake
Buried rupture earthquakes